Masłów or Masłówa may refer to:

 Masłów, Lower Silesian Voivodeship, a village in south-west Poland
 Masłów, Świętokrzyskie Voivodeship, a village in south-central Poland
Gmina Masłów, an administrative district in south-central Poland
Masłów Drugi, a village in Gmina Masłów

See also
 Maslov, a surname
 Maslow (disambiguation)